Andy McMillan is a co-founder of XOXO festival.

Career 

McMillan attended university at Queen's University Belfast for Music Technology, hoping to make his way into a career in radio production.

Build 

McMillan launched Build in 2009, a web design conference held annually in Belfast, Northern Ireland from 2009 to 2013. Starting as a single day of talks, it grew into a week-long festival, including music, film screenings, workshops, evening lectures, and a beer festival.

The first Build was held in 2009 at Waterfront Hall, with positive coverage from the BBC and Wired. The Belfast Telegraph said it was a "must-attend" that "provides nourishment for the design geek's soul."

XOXO 
In 2012, McMillan and co-organizer Andy Baio launched XOXO Festival, a four-day conference and festival about independently produced art and technology held in Portland, Oregon. The project raised $175,000 via Kickstarter, selling all 400 tickets in 50 hours.

PayPal controversy 

In May 2012, PayPal froze two of McMillan's accounts, withholding over $64,000 of funds collected from Build's ticket sales as collateral against pre-orders of The Manual. The resulting social media backlash led to a public response and personal apology to McMillan from former PayPal president David A. Marcus, who released the funds and asked McMillan to work with him personally on improving the service.

References

External links 
 

1987 births
Living people
British designers
British publishers (people)
Artists from Belfast
Web designers